Tarail is an upazila of Kishoreganj District in the Division of Dhaka, Bangladesh.

Geography
It has 23232 households and total area 136.88 km2.

Demographics
As of the 1991 Bangladesh census, Tarail has a population of 138488. Males constitute 50.41% of the population, and females 49.59%. This Upazila's eighteen up population is 62143. Tarail has an average literacy rate of 17.5% (7+ years), and the national average of 32.4% literate.

Administration
Tarail Upazila is divided into Tarail Municipality and seven union parishads: Damiha, Dhala, Digdair, Jawar, Rauti, Talganga, and Tarail Sachail. The union parishads are subdivided into 75 mauzas and 116 villages.

See also
 Upazilas of Bangladesh
 Districts of Bangladesh
 Divisions of Bangladesh

References

Upazilas of Kishoreganj District